The 1986 Virginia Slims of Los Angeles was a women's tennis tournament played on outdoor hard courts at the Manhattan Country Club in Manhattan Beach, California in the United States and was part of the Category 4 tier of the 1986 WTA Tour. It was the 13th edition of the tournament and was held from August 11 through August 17, 1986. First-seeded Martina Navratilova won the singles title and earned $45,000 first-prize money.

Finals

Singles
 Martina Navratilova defeated  Chris Evert-Lloyd 7–6(7–5), 6–3
 It was Navratilova's 8th singles title of the year and the 119th of her career.

Doubles
 Martina Navratilova /  Pam Shriver defeated  Claudia Kohde-Kilsch /  Helena Suková 6–4, 6–3

See also
 Evert–Navratilova rivalry

References

External links
 ITF tournament edition details
 Tournament draws

Los Angeles
LA Women's Tennis Championships
Virginia Slims of Los Angeles
Virginia Slims of Los Angeles
Virginia Slims of Los Angeles
Virginia Slims of Los Angeles